George Wiedemann, Sr. (1833–1890) was a German-American brewer.

Wiedemann was born in Eisenach, Germany, in 1833. He came to the United States as a young man in 1854. first finding work in the brewing industry in New York, Louisville, and Cincinnati. He moved to Newport, Kentucky in 1870. He was the founder of the George Wiedemann Brewing Company, which became Kentucky's largest brewery. It was located at 601 Columbia Street in
Newport, Kentucky. Wiedemann beer was synonymous with Newport.  Wiedemann promoted itself as "America's only registered beer" and often used humorous radio commercials as part of its advertising campaigns.

Wiedemann married Agnes Rohman and they had six children. Newspaper accounts described Wiedemann as an honest man with a natural sociability and a dignified businessman.

On May 25, 1890, George Wiedemann became ill and died at his home at 188 East Third St in Newport. The business was continued to operate by his sons, George Jr. and Charles.

Wiedemann Brewing was merged with G. Heileman Brewing Company, in 1967 and was operated as Wiedemann Division, G. Heileman Brewing Company, Inc. The primary brands were Wiedemann Fine Beer, Royal Amber Beer, Blatz Beer/Cream Ale and other assorted Heileman labels. The brewery was closed in 1983.

The Wiedemann name was then sold and was brewed by the Pittsburgh Brewing Co. in Pittsburgh, Pennsylvania until 2007 when the brand was dropped.

2012, a Newport, Kentucky company, Geo. Wiedemann Brewing Company, LLC, re-established the brand and started brewing Wiedemann Special Lager as a small-batch, craft beer.
The name, the recipe, logo and all intellectual rights were bought out by beer brewer and journalist Jon Newberry. In 2018 Jon and wife, Betsy purchased an old funeral home in Cincinnati and after a few years of renovating the old building it opened up not only a brewery but a taproom and restaurant.

In 2019 the Sipple Family, Covington natives, bought the home of George Wiedemann, Jr. at 401 Park Avenue. The historic home has been renovated and is now utilized as a place of business for the 2nd generation family business, Centennial Talent Strategy and Executive Search. Centennial, a family business like the Wiedemann Brewery Company, is one of the Greater Cincinnati region's largest and most prominent firms in their industry. 401 Park Avenue is also the home of IMPACT Cowork, an executive coworking and meeting rental space, and Talent Magnet Institute, a consulting firm, with a weekly podcast recorded in the historic building.

The legacy of Wiedemann family business lives on through the Newberry Family and The Sipple Family.

References

External links
Guide to the Wiedemann Brewery Blueprint Collection

People from Newport, Kentucky
1833 births
1890 deaths
American people of German descent
American brewers
19th-century American businesspeople